The 1984 Masters (also known as the 1984 Volvo Masters for sponsorship reasons) was a men's tennis tournament held in Madison Square Garden, New York City, United States between 8 January and 13 January 1985.  It was the year-end championship of the 1984 Volvo Grand Prix tour. First-seeded John McEnroe won the singles title.

Finals

Singles

 John McEnroe defeated  Ivan Lendl 7–5, 6–0, 6–4
 It was McEnroe's 13th singles title of the year and the 59th of his career.

Doubles

 Peter Fleming /  John McEnroe defeated  Mark Edmondson /  Sherwood Stewart 6-3, 6-1

See also
 Lendl–McEnroe rivalry

References

External links
 ITF tournament edition details

 
Volvo Masters
Grand Prix tennis circuit year-end championships
Tennis tournaments in the United States
1985 in American tennis